Youth Justice is a triannual peer-reviewed academic journal covering  analyses of juvenile/youth justice systems, law, policy, and practice. The journal's editors-in-chief are Barry Goldson (University of Liverpool) and John Muncie (The Open University). It was established in 2001 and is currently published by SAGE Publications.

Abstracting and indexing 
Youth Justice is abstracted and indexed in Scopus, SocINDEX, and Sociological Abstracts.

External links 
 

SAGE Publishing academic journals
English-language journals
Criminology journals
Triannual journals
Publications established in 2001